Pacific High School is a public continuation high school in the Ventura Unified School District located in Ventura, California.

References

External links
 Official page

Public high schools in California
Buildings and structures in Ventura, California
High schools in Ventura County, California